Richia is a genus of moths of the family Noctuidae.

Species
 Richia chortalis (Harvey, 1875)
 Richia cyminopristes (Dyar, 1912)
 Richia hahama (Dyar, 1919)
 Richia herculeana (Schaus, 1898)
 Richia larga (J.B. Smith, 1908)
 Richia lobato (Barnes, 1904)
 Richia madida (Guenée, 1852)
 Richia parentalis (Grote, 1879) (syn: Richia distichoides (Grote, 1883))
 Richia praefixa Morrison, 1875 (syn: Richia docilis (Grote, 1881), formerly Eurois praefixa)
 Richia pyrsogramma (Dyar, 1916)
 Richia serano (Smith, 1910)
 Richia triphaenoides (Dyar, 1912)

References
Natural History Museum Lepidoptera genus database
Richia at funet

Noctuinae